Robert Henry McAnally (8 December 1882 - 10 July 1956) was an Australian composer and conductor.

Career
He was a prolific composer, arranger, conductor and instructor. He was member of the Salvation Army Leichhardt Corps.

From an early age he was an instructor for brass instruments in the brass band in the Salvation Army, also giving lessons for brass instruments outside the band. He later became a captain in the Salvation Army and the conductor of the Australian Travelling Band.

In 1899 he composed the musical score for Soldiers of the Cross, one of the first films made and produced in Australia.

McAnally was also the conductor of other wind and brass bands including the New South Wales Transport Band. He was president of the Brass Bands' Association; served on the board of music for the Salvation Army in Australia; adjudicated band competitions; and was a founding member of the New South Wales Bandmasters' Association.

An event is held by the Australian School Band and Orchestra Festival each year honouring the legacy of McAnally

List of Works

Brass Band - Marches 

 A.B. and O.N., The - Specially dedicated to the Australian Band and Orchestra News 1927
 Bear Fighter, The (March) - Arranged 1946
Can We Keep a Secret - Arranged 1940
 Dexterity
Gay Admiral, The (March) - 1946
 Indefatigable - 1956
Indomitable (March)
 Spitfire (march)
 V for Victory - Composed 1941
 Waltzing Matilda - Arranged for the opening of the Sydney Harbour Bridge
 We're All Cobbers Together by Jack O'Hagan - Arranged 1940
 We're off to see the Wizard - Arranged 1939

Brass Band - Other Works 

 All By Yourself in the Moonlight
 Badge from Your Coat, The
Beautiful Dreamer
 Beautiful Isle of Somewhere
 Begin the Begine
 Blue Room, The by Lorenz Hart and Richard Rogers - Arranged 1926
 By the Fireside
 Delores
 Every Time I See You
 Gipsy Moon
 Good-bye (White Horse Inn)
 Guardmont, The
 He Played His Ukulele As The Ship Went Down
 I'll Remember
 If A Grey-Haired Lady Says Hows Yer Father
 If I Had My Life To Live Over
 Indian Summer
 Mountain Mists (Waltz)
 Nun's Chorus, The
 Please
 Sam, The Old Accordion Man
 Slavic dance No. 1 by Antonín Dvořák - Arranged 1954
 Underneath the Arches - Arranged 1959
 Who? - Arranged 1925
 Wrights Hymn Sheet No 1
 Wrights Hymn Sheet No 2
 You Ought To See Sally On Sunday - Arranged 1933

Bibliography

References 

1882 births
1959 deaths
19th-century composers
19th-century male musicians
20th-century composers
20th-century Australian male musicians
20th-century Australian musicians
Australian composers
Australian male composers
Brass band composers
Brass band conductors